The 1974 Monte Carlo Open was a men's tennis tournament played on outdoor clay courts at the Monte Carlo Country Club in Roquebrune-Cap-Martin, France. The tournament was part of the Red Group of the 1974 World Championship Tennis circuit. It was the 69th edition of the event and was held from 8 April through 14 April 1974. Unseeded Andrew Pattison won the singles title.

Finals

Singles

 Andrew Pattison defeated  Ilie Năstase 5–7, 6–3, 6–4
 It was Pattison's first singles title of his career.

Doubles

 John Alexander /  Phil Dent defeated  Manuel Orantes /  Tony Roche 7–6, 4–6, 7–6, 6–3

References

External links
 
 ATP tournament profile
 ITF tournament details

Monte-Carlo Masters
Monte Carlo WCT
Monte Carlo WCT
Monte
Monte Carlo WCT